David Graddol (1953 - 1 March 2019) was a British linguist who worked in applied linguistics, discourse analysis, sociolinguistics, and history of linguistics. He died on 1 March 2019.

Research interest
He was perhaps best known for his 1997 book The future of English?, published by the British Council, in which he offers scenarios for how English as a world language may develop. Most notably, he pointed out that native speakers of English were or would soon be outnumbered by those who speak English as a second or foreign language. In an article that focuses more specifically on this issue, he stated the following:

Graddol's views about English as a world language are similar to, though not identical with, those held by his linguist colleague David Crystal.

Career
He graduated from the University of York with a BA in Language and Linguistics in 1975, also in Sociology in 1983. He earned his PhD from the University of Stockholm.

Personal life
He married Margaret Keeton and they have had triplet daughters.

References

Works (selected) 

 Graddol, David (1997). The future of English? A guide to forecasting the popularity of the English language in the 21st century. London: British Council. Available for free from the website of the British Council .
 Graddol, David (1999). The decline of the native speaker. In Graddol, David/Meinhof, Ulrike (eds.). English in a Changing World. AILA Review 13, 57–68.
 Graddol, David (2006). English Next. London: British Council. Available for free from the website of the British Council .

Linguists from the United Kingdom
1953 births
Applied linguists
Living people
Alumni of the University of York